The Tandula River runs through the Balod and Durg District of the state of Chhattisgarh in India, allowing villages in the district to use its water for irrigation.
It originates from bhanupratappur district,kanker, chhattisgarh.It flows to the tandula near Balod, which supplies water for the local Bhilai Steel Plant.It is tributary of Shivnath River  which drains into Mahanadi.

Rivers of Chhattisgarh
Rivers of India